Evolutionary creation, also presented as Evolutionary creationism, is the religious belief that God as Creator brings about his plan through processes of evolution. It is a type of creationism which, like theistic evolution, accepts modern science, but there are theological differences. Its proponents, who tend to be conservative evangelical Christians, hold that God is actively involved in evolution to a greater extent than theistic evolutionists.

Proponents
In June 2003, Denis Lamoureux wrote an article which appeared in Crux on "Evolutionary Creation: Beyond the Evolution vs. Creation Debate", and in 2008 he published a theological book on Evolutionary Creation: A Christian Approach to Evolution aimed both at anti-evolution Christians including young Earth creationists, and at those looking to confirm their reconciliation of faith with evolutionary science. His main argument that Genesis presents "science and history of the day" as "incidental vessels" to convey spiritual truths would be unlikely to persuade young Earth creationists. The faith position presented by Lamoureux helps put over his message, but makes the book unsuitable for use in U.S. public schools. Lamoureux rewrote his article as a 2009 journal paper, incorporating excerpts from his books, in which he noted the similarities of his views to theistic evolution, but objected to that term as making evolution the focus rather than creation, and distanced his beliefs from the deistic or more liberal beliefs included in theistic evolution.

There is diversity among evolutionary creationists in explaining how these two concepts fit together.

References

Publications
  (pdf)
 

Religious belief and doctrine
Evolution and religion
Religion and science
Creationism